The Western Pilbara spiny-tailed skink (Egernia cygnitos) is a species of large skink, a lizard in the family Scincidae. The species is native to the Pilbara in northwestern Australia.

See also
Egernia epsisolus

References

Skinks of Australia
Egernia
Reptiles described in 2011
Taxa named by Paul Doughty
Taxa named by Luke Kealley
Taxa named by Steve Donnellan (scientist)